Victoria Star 2 is a  passenger only foot ferry owned and operated by San Juan Cruises. The ferry has operated during the summer months between Bellingham, Washington, United States, and the Inner Harbour in Victoria, British Columbia, Canada, making one round trip daily. For the 2011 season, service to Victoria has been cancelled and the ferry is operating to Friday Harbor and other destinations in the San Juan Islands.

The vessel started her life as a mud boat ferrying supplies and personnel in the Gulf of Mexico. Converted into a passenger ferry, she later served the islands off Los Angeles, California (including Catalina Island). In 1992 and 1995 she served as a spectator's vessel during the America's Cup races held off the coast of San Diego, California. She was purchased later in 1995 by her current owner and brought to her current homeport of Bellingham, Washington where she continues to serve as a ferry and tourist vessel.

Primary power is provided by three (3) Detroit Diesel 12V-71 TI (Turbo - Intercooled) engines each driving its own propeller.  Auxiliary power is supplied by Detroit Diesel generators. Typically a crew consists of one captain, one mate (unlicensed), and two deckhands to operate the vessel during each trip.

References

External links

Ferries of British Columbia
Ferries of Washington (state)
Transport in Victoria, British Columbia
Bellingham, Washington
1995 ships